The 2012–13 Iraqi Elite League was the 39th season of the competition since its establishment in 1974. The season began on 19 October 2012 and finished on 4 September 2013. Al-Shorta were crowned champions for the third time, finishing on 72 points, two points ahead of nearest competitors Erbil.

Having only managed a seventh place finish in the previous season, Al-Shorta's results improved significantly under the presidency of Ayad Bunyan and they were able to outperform favourites Erbil, Duhok, Al-Zawraa and Al-Quwa Al-Jawiya.

On the final day of the season, three teams were all still in the race for the title. Al-Shorta needed a win against Al-Talaba to secure the league, whilst Erbil had to defeat Al-Najaf and hope that Al-Shorta failed to win their game if they wanted to retain their title. Al-Quwa Al-Jawiya needed both Al-Shorta and Erbil to slip up and needed to defeat Masafi Al-Wasat by a large goal margin in order for them to go home with the trophy.

All three teams ended up winning their respective matches, making Al-Shorta the champions. It was the club's first league title since the 1997–98 season.

SWAT incident
On 23 June 2013, after a match with Al-Quwa Al-Jawiya, seven football players of Karbalaa and their manager were beaten by the anti-terror police. They used sticks and batons against the eight men.

Five of them were in critical condition, and on June 30, Mohammed Abbas Al-Jabouri, the club's manager, died in hospital. Several teams refused to play their matches in round 25 as a result of the incident.

League table

Results

Season statistics

Top scorers

Hat-tricks

Notes
4 Player scored 4 goals

Media coverage

See also
 2012–13 Iraq Division One
 2012–13 Iraq FA Cup
 2013 Baghdad Cup

References

External links
 Iraq Football Association

Iraqi Premier League seasons
1
Iraq